Papyrus Oxyrhynchus 60 (P. Oxy. 60) is a letter addressed to the council of Oxyrhynchus, written by the strategus Hermias, in Greek. The manuscript was written on papyrus in the form of a sheet. It was discovered by Grenfell and Hunt in 1897 in Oxyrhynchus. The document was written on 17 August 323. Currently it is housed in the Library of the Trinity College (Pap. D 1) in Dublin. The text was published by Grenfell and Hunt in 1898.

In the letter, Hermias notifies the council that a supply of meat has been sent to Nicopolis to feed troops stationed there. The measurements of the fragment are 248 by 123 mm.

See also 
 Oxyrhynchus Papyri
 Papyrus Oxyrhynchus 59
 Papyrus Oxyrhynchus 61

References 

060
4th-century manuscripts